Jenni Barber (born July 22, 1983) is an American actress and singer best known for her performances in musical theatre and for her role as Lisa Heffenbacher on The Electric Company (2009 - 2011).

Early life 
Barber was born in Mansfield, Ohio.
There she took voice lessons from vocal trainer Lori Turner. She graduated summa cum laude from the University of Michigan School of Music with a Bachelor of Fine Arts in musical theatre in 2005, after receiving an Earl V. Moore award.

Career

Television 
As previously mentioned, Barber played Lisa Heffenbacher in The Electric Company 2009 TV series.

Stage 
Barber made her Broadway debut as Olive Ostrovsky in The 25th Annual Putnam County Spelling Bee in 2007, after playing the character in San Francisco and Boston productions. In 2008, she appeared in From Up Here at New York City Center; she had a minor role, but The New York Times review called her a scene stealer. In 2010, she played Audrey in As You Like It, in the Brooklyn Academy of Music's Harvey Theatre.

She starred as Toni Simmons in the 2011 Off-Broadway revival of the play Cactus Flower in the Westside Theatre, receiving mixed reviews comparing her to Goldie Hawn in the 1969 film. In 2012, she played porn actress Sundown LeMay in The Performers opposite Henry Winkler and Cheyenne Jackson.

In 2013, Barber played stripper Joan opposite Nathan Lane in the award-winning The Nance. The following year, she joined the cast of the Broadway production of Wicked, in the role of Glinda. In early 2015, she played Sibyl in the romance Private Lives at Hartford Stage, followed by Elizabeth, a Mormon wife, in the Encores! revival of Paint Your Wagon.

She was in the 2017 Broadway revival of Sunday in the Park with George as Celeste #2/Elaine and understudied Annaleigh Ashford.

References

External links 

Actresses from Ohio
People from Mansfield, Ohio
University of Michigan School of Music, Theatre & Dance alumni
Living people
American stage actresses
American television actresses
Singers from Ohio
21st-century American actresses
21st-century American singers
1983 births